The rufous-browed peppershrike (Cyclarhis gujanensis) is a passerine bird in the vireo family. It is widespread and often common in woodland, forest edge, and cultivation with some tall trees from Mexico and Trinidad south to Argentina and Uruguay.

It is bull-headed with a thick, somewhat shrike-like bill, which typically is blackish below and pinkish-grey above. The head is grey with a strong rufous eyebrow. The crown is often tinged with brown. The upperparts are green, and the yellow throat and breast shade into a white belly. The subspecies ochrocephala from the south-eastern part of its range has a shorter rufous eyebrow and a brown-tinged crown, while the subspecies virenticeps, contrerasi and saturata from north-western Peru and western Ecuador have greenish-yellow (not grey, as in the "typical" subspecies) nape, auriculars and cheeks.

The song is a whistled phrase with the rhythm "Do you wash every week?", but there are extensive variations depending on both individual and range. It is often heard but hard to see as it feeds on insects and spiders high in the foliage, though it has been observed to take small lizards as well.

The nest is a flimsy cup high in a tree with a typical clutch of two or three pinkish-white eggs lightly blotched with brown. Like most vireos, the peppershrike ejects parasitic cowbird eggs.

Image gallery

References

Further reading

External links

 
 
 
 
 
 
 
 

rufous-browed peppershrike
Birds of Central America
Birds of South America
rufous-browed peppershrike
rufous-browed peppershrike